The Golden Bear is an ISU annual international and inter-club figure skating competition held in Zagreb, Croatia. Held since 1986, the event is organized by the Medveščak figure skating club. It is the equivalent of the Golden Spin of Zagreb intended for Junior and Novice skaters, as well as skaters below the Novice level (Cubs and Chicks). In 2012, senior-level events were added. Skaters may compete in three disciplines: men's singles, ladies' singles, and pair skating.

Senior medalists

Men

Ladies

Junior medalists

Men

Ladies

Pairs

Advanced novice medalists

Men

Ladies

Pairs

References

External links
 KKK Medvescak
 Slovene Skating Union: Historical placements: Slovenian athletes
 Croatian Skating Union: History
 2002 Competition 

Figure skating competitions
Sport in Zagreb
Figure skating in Croatia
International figure skating competitions hosted by Croatia
Recurring events established in 1986
1986 establishments in Croatia